You Can Be An Angel 2 (Chinese: 你也可以是天使2) is a Singaporean nursing series produced and telecast on Mediacorp Channel 8 in collaboration with the Ministry of Health (Singapore). The show aired at 9pm on weekdays and had a repeat telecast at 8am the following day. It is supported by the Care To Go Beyond movement by MOH. It stars Zoe Tay, Xiang Yun, Rebecca Lim, Bryan Wong, Aloysius Pang,  Xu Bin & Carrie Wong as the casts of the second series.

Cast

Cameo appearances

Development
The drama was first announced in early 2016. This was confirmed in a commercial featuring Rebecca Lim and Aloysius Pang, right before the Care To Go Beyond commercial.

In June 2016, imaging sessions were done for the cast, and Zoe Tay, Bryan Wong, Xu Bin, Aloysius Pang and Carrie Wong attended a 3-hour nursing course at Yishun Community Hospital in preparation for the series. This course covers hand hygiene, wound care, CPR, health checkup, CADD pump and Patient-controlled analgesia (PCA).

The series held its lensing ceremony on 30 June 2016. Zoe Tay, Xiang Yun, Bryan Wong, Rebecca Lim, Xu Bin, 
Aloysius Pang, Zheng Geping and new additions Carrie Wong and Thomas Ong were present at the event. At the ceremony, Tan Soh Chin, Ministry of Health’s Chief Nursing Officer, thanked the cast for having “portrayed nursing so well” in the first season, and noted that the intake of nurses at the diploma and degree levels have risen for two years since 2014. He also noted that the first season "had a very good outcome and high viewership, and also had very positive responses and encouraging feedback". Tan added that the goal of the series is to "profile nursing so the public will understand the kind of work that nurses are doing, and also to give accurate information about nurses at work," and "at the same time, (to show that) the work itself is satisfying and rewarding, and that there is a career path for them to progress (along)."

Elvin Ng, who was confirmed to be part of the casting lineup, is revealed to be returning in a cameo appearance with Sheila Sim – the first season, aired and took place  in 2015, was left with Sim's character going abroad for three years; and Ng went along with her.

Awards and nominations

Star Awards 2017
You Can Be an Angel 2  is also up for 6 nominations in Star Awards 2017.

The other drama serials that are nominated for Star Awards 2017 are Hero (2016 TV series), C.L.I.F. 4, Fire Up & The Dream Job.

The other drama serials that are nominated for Best Theme Song are The Dream Job, Eat Already?, Life - Fear Not & If Only I Could (TV series).

It won 1 out of 6 nominations.

Asian Television Award

See also
 Ministry of Health (Singapore)

References

Singapore Chinese dramas
2016 Singaporean television series debuts
2016 Singaporean television series endings
Singaporean medical television series
2016 Singaporean television seasons
Channel 8 (Singapore) original programming